The 2019–20 Illinois State Redbirds men's basketball team represented Illinois State University during the 2019–20 NCAA Division I men's basketball season. The Redbirds, led by eighth-year head coach Dan Muller, played their home games at Redbird Arena in Normal, Illinois as a member of the Missouri Valley Conference. They finished the season 10–21, 5–13 in conference play to finish in ninth place. They lost in the opening round of the MVC tournament as the number nine seed to Drake.

Previous season 
The Redbrids finished the season 17–16, 9–9 in MVC play to finish in a three-way tie for fifth place. As the No. 7 seed in the MVC tournament, they defeated Evansville in the first round, before losing to Drake in the quarterfinals.

Roster

Schedule and results

|-
!colspan=9 style=|Exhibition season

|-
!colspan=9 style=|Non-conference regular season

|-
!colspan=9 style=|Missouri Valley Conference regular season

|-
!colspan=9 style=|State FarmMissouri Valley Conference tournament
|-

|-

Source

References

Illinois State Redbirds men's basketball seasons
Illinois State Redbirds men's basketball
Illinois State Redbirds men's basketball
Illinois State Redbirds